Rodrigo Jiménez (or Ximénez) de Rada (c. 1170 – 10 June 1247) was a Roman Catholic bishop and historian, who held an important religious and political role in the Kingdom of Castile during the reigns of Alfonso VIII and Ferdinand III, a period in which the Castilian monarchy consolidated its political hegemony over the rest of polities in the Iberian Peninsula. He was at the helm of the Archdiocese of Toledo from 1208 to 1247. He authored De rebus Hispaniae, a history of the Iberian Peninsula.

Biography 
Rodrigo Jiménez de Rada was born circa 1170 in Puente la Reina, Kingdom of Navarre. He was born from a Navarrese noble family and was educated by his uncle, Martín de la Finojosa, abbot of Saint Mary of Huerta and bishop of Sigüenza. He studied Law and Theology in the Universities of Bologna and Paris. When he returned to Navarre he mediated between that kingdom and Castile and he became friend of King Alfonso VIII of Castile, who nominated him as bishop of Osma and later put pressure on the chapter of Toledo to elect him as archbishop of Toledo. His election as archbishop of Toledo was confirmed by Pope Innocent III on 12 February 1209. In addition, Alfonso VIII appointed him as major chancellor of Castile.

He played a key role in the war against the Almohads and at the battle of Las Navas de Tolosa (1212). He was the moral leader of that war, which was considered in Europe as a crusade in which many European knights took part. He sent afterwards missionaries to Morocco. His archbishopric gained a lot of possessions throughout the Guadalquivir valley, especially around Quesada and received further generous donations from kings and lords.

As archbishop of Toledo, he promoted the building of the cathedral and placed the first stone in 1226 (it was not completed until 1493), restored the dioceses of Baeza and Córdoba after the Christian conquest of those cities and defended the primacy of his see in Spain against the pretensions of Braga and Santiago.

He promoted the cultural life of Toledo, a city that was the cultural entrepôt of Christian and Muslim civilizations during the Middle Ages. He ordered the translation of the Koran to Latin and composed a wide historiographic work. His De rebus Hispaniae, a general history of Spain, was very soon translated into Spanish and was very influential on the General History of Alfonso X.

He died near Lyons while returning from a visit to the pope, and is interred in the monastery of Saint Mary of Huerta.

Writings
De rebus Hispaniae
Hunnorum, Vandalorum et Silingorum Historia
Ostrogothorum Historia
Historia Romanorum
Historia Arabum

See also 

Infante Philip of Castile
Infante Sancho of Castile

Bibliography
Gorosterratzu, Javier: D. Rodrigo Jiménez de Rada. Gran estadista, escritor y prelado, Pamplona: Imprenta Vda. de T. Bescansa, 1925
Roderici Ximenii de Rada opera omnia (ed. by Juan Fernández Valerde), Turnhout: Brepols, 1992–1993
Adro, Xavier: Rodrigo Jiménez de Rada. Estadista y artífice, siglo XIII, Barcelona: Casals, 1989
Pérez de Rada, Francisco Javier: El arzobispo don Rodrigo Jiménez de Rada, Madrid: Fundación Jaureguízar, 2002
Pick, Lucy: Conflict and coexistence. Archbishop Rodrigo and the Muslims and Jews of Medieval Spain, Ann Arbor: University of Michigan, 2004

Informational notes

References

1170s births
1247 deaths
12th-century nobility from the Kingdom of Navarre
13th-century Roman Catholic archbishops in Castile
Bishops of Osma
Archbishops of Toledo
13th-century Spanish historians
Historians of Spain
Year of birth uncertain
13th-century Latin writers